Nigel Rodgers (born 1953) is a British writer, environmentalist and critic.

Rodgers has a degree in history and history of art from Cambridge University.  
He is the founder of Pipedown, the Campaign for Freedom from Piped Music, and is a member of the Educational Writers' Group of the Society of Authors.

Work
He has written 15 books including Incredible Optical Illusions (Simon & Schuster 1998); The Traveller's Atlas with John Man and Chris Schüler (1999); Hitler and Churchill (Hodder 2001); Philosophers Behaving Badly with Mel Thompson; Roman Architecture (2006); Roman Empire (2008); Understand Existentialism with  Mel Thompson (Hodder, 2010);  Existentialism Made Easy with  Mel Thompson (Hodder, 2011); The Greek World (2010); The Art and Architecture of Ancient Greece  (2012);  Why Noise Matters with Arline Bronzaft, Francis McManus, John Stewart and Val Weedon (Routledge 2011);  The Dandy — Peacock  or Enigma?  and  The Umbrella Unfurled (2013).  
His latest books are Manet: his Life and Work (2015) The Bruegels (2016) and The Colosseum, a guide book-cum-history about Rome's most famous monument, from its inauguration in AD80 to its recent triumphant restoration, published in May 2018.  His books have been translated into fourteen languages.

References

1952 births
Living people
Writers from London
Academics from London
English sociologists
Alumni of Queens' College, Cambridge
20th-century British writers
English historians of philosophy
English philosophers
Writers about the Soviet Union